Irene James (born 1952) is a Welsh Labour politician who represented the constituency of Islwyn in the National Assembly for Wales from 2003 to 2011.

James was educated Newbridge Grammar School and the Cardiff College of Music & Drama. She completed her teacher training at Borough Road College, London, after which she became a special needs teacher at Risca Primary School.  Her main interests are jobs, education and health. James was agent to Don Touhig MP at the last general election in 2005.

James announced, in July 2009, that she would be standing down from the National Assembly for Wales at the next Assembly election (May 2011).

References

External links
Welsh Labour Party Website

Offices held

1952 births
Living people
Welsh Labour members of the Senedd
Wales AMs 2003–2007
Wales AMs 2007–2011